Guangren Temple, also called Guangren Lama Temple, is a Buddhist temple located in Lianhu District of Xi'an, Shaanxi, China. It is the only Tibetan Buddhist temple in Shaanxi.

History

Guangren Temple was first established by Kangxi Emperor in 1705, during the 44th year of Kangxi period (1661–1922) of the Qing dynasty (1644–1911). During the Qing dynasty, a largest number of Tibetan Buddhist leaders had to give an audience to the emperor in Beijing. Therefore, the Qing court built this Tibetan Buddhist temple in Shaanxi to provide places for the religious leaders to get accommodation and participate in Buddhist activities.

After the fall of the Qing dynasty in 1911, the temple was used as an office of the local government. In 1931, the bombs blew up the abbot's room, but soon it was reconstructed by Yang Hucheng.

In 1952, the temple was renovated and redecorated under the state financial allocation. In 1983, it has been designated as a National Key Buddhist Temple in Han Chinese Area by the State Council of China.

Architecture

The entire temple faces south with the Shanmen, Four Heavenly Kings Hall, Changshou Hall, Hufa Jingang Hall, Main Hall, Reception Room, HalI of the God of Wealth, Thousand Buddha Hall, Buddhist Texts Library, and Mahavira Hall along the central axis of the complex.

Shanmen
Under the eaves is a plaque with the Chinese characters "Guangren Temple" written by Kangxi Emperor in the Qing dynasty (1644–1911). Statue of "Two Deer Listening to Sutras" on the roof of Shanmen. "Two Deer Listening to Sutras" is a symbol of the construction of Tibetan Buddhist temples, which comes from the story that two deer were attracted to listen to sutras dedicatedly when Sakyamuni made his first teaching in Migadaye.

Yingbi
The Eighteen Arhats were carved in the Yingbi.

Guanyin Hall
In the center of the eaves of the hall is a plaque, on which there are the words "Guangren Temple", written by Zhao Puchu, the former Venerable Master of the Buddhist Association of China. In the middle of the hall placed the statue of Thousand Handed and Eyed Guanyin, with statues of Maitreya Buddha, Skanda and Four Heavenly Kings on the left and right sides.

Hufa Jingang Hall
The Hufa Jingang Hall houses statues of Yamantaka, Mahakala, Yama Dharmaraja, and Palden Lhamo.

Changshou Hall
The Changshou Hall enshrining the statues of Amitayus. Statue of White Tara is placed on the northwest corner, statues of Bhaisajyaguru and Ksitigarbha are placed on the north corner, statue of Ushnisha Vijaya is placed on the southwest corner, and statues of Four Armed Guanyin and Akashagarbha are placed on the south corner. In front of the hall, a wooden plaque with Chinese characters "" written by Kang Youwei in 1923 is hung on the eaves.

Green Tara Hall
The Green Tara Hall is the second main hall of the temple. In the middle is 
Green Tara, statues of Manjushri and Samantabhadra stand on the left and right sides of Sakyamuni's statue. A plaque with Chinese characters "" written by Kangxi Emperor is hung on the eaves. A plaque with Chinese characters "" written by vice-president of the Buddhist Association of China Jamyang Tubudan is hung on its west.

Thousand Buddha Hall
Inside the hall, statues of Je Tsongkhapa and his disciples Goshir Gyaltsab and Khedrup Gelek Pelzang, 1st Panchen Lama are enshrined in the hall. In the interior walls thousand miniature gilded bronze statues of Tsongkhapa are inlaid in the baldachines. The pillars inside the hall are engraved with the Four Bodhisattvas, namely Manjushri, Samantabhadra, Guanyin and Ksitigarbha. The door pillars are also engraved with four Bodhistattvas: Akashagarbha, Nivaranaviskambin, Vajrapani and Maitreya.

Buddhist Texts Library
The roof of the Buddhist Texts Library is covered with golden tiles, which symbolized the highest position of the Tibetan Buddhism. A 2,500 years history lotus throne are placed in the hall, which came from ancient India and housed in Kaiyuan previously. Under the eaves a plaque with "" written by Qianlong Emperor is hung on the architrave.

National treasure
The Buddhist Texts Library now stores 6,600 volumes of Prajnaparamita sutras which were awarded by Kangxi Emperor in the Qing dynasty (1644–1911).

References

Bibliography

External links
 

Tibetan Buddhist temples in Shaanxi
Buddhist temples in Xi'an
Buildings and structures in Xi'an
Tourist attractions in Xi'an
18th-century establishments in China
18th-century Buddhist temples
Gelug monasteries and temples
Religious buildings and structures completed in 1705